Jason Grill (born August 10, 1979) is a radio host and former Democratic member of the Missouri House of Representatives.

Grill attended University of Missouri School of Law, Saint Louis University, and Loyola University Chicago. He attended High-school at St. Pius X High School in Kansas City, Missouri.

Second-term state representative
In Grill's second term in the Missouri House of Representatives, he sponsored and passed legislation that expanded access to autism diagnosis, treatment and therapy. The legislation was passed with the support of both parties. The bill allowed families to finally get the insurance coverage their children needed. Governor Nixon signed the autism bill into law.

JGrill Media, Consulting, Attorney at Law
Grill is the owner of JGrill Media, LLC, where he focuses and consults on media relations and outreach, public relations and strategies, communications, marketing strategies, public/civic affairs and government relations. He also works as a local, state and national contributor, commentator and analyst. Grill writes for the Huffington Post, Politico, and the KC Business Magazine. He is a television political analyst for Fox 4 WDAF, and host of the Entrepreneur KC Show.

References

External links
 Jason Grill's Main Homepage

Members of the Missouri House of Representatives
1979 births
Living people
Saint Louis University alumni
Loyola University Chicago alumni
University of Missouri School of Law alumni
Businesspeople in mass media